Jason Withe (born 16 August 1971) is an English former football player, turned coach and manager.

Football career
The son of former Aston Villa striker and European Cup winner Peter Withe, Jason Withe's professional career did not see the success of his father's with much of his time spent playing in the reserves and non-league. He spent 1986 to 1990 with West Bromwich Albion before spending some time in Finland with KPV Kokkola in 1990. Returning to England, he played for Stafford Rangers, Stockport County, Crewe Alexandra, Burnley and Telford United.

Post-football coaching career
His first post-football job in coaching was at Birmingham City where he was Community Football Director which was followed by time with Aston Villa where he worked as a coach educator. He was also employed as a Football Association (FA) tutor, delivering FA qualifications to budding coaches.

Management career in East/ South East Asia
He was 'Head Coach' of Thailand Premier League side BEC Tero Sasana, leading the side to  domestic double in 1999–2000. He moved to Singapore to become manager of Home United who play in the S-League where he steered them to a respectable second place in 2002. A moved back to Thailand followed as Technical Director and then Head Coach of Bangkok Bank FC. As of November 2019, he is a coach with the Singapore-based youth football academy, JSSL, which is also the organiser of annual JSSL 7's football tournament. In 2005, he became Assistant National Team Manager for the Indonesia Football Association.<

Return to the UK
Withe moved back to the UK where he obtained his UEFA Pro Licence in 2006 and in 2007 became Head of Youth for Aldershot Town. He then scouted for Norwich City During this period he was also chairman of Knowle.

A spell as Director of Football for Southam United followed in 2010.

He was appointed as the centre director of Leicester City Girls Centre of Excellence in June 2011.

Philippines
Philippines Football League team United City announced on March 30, 2021 that they have hired Withe as their head coach. He is expected to take part in the club's 2021 AFC Champions League campaign, although he would take an informal role of being a consultant to Filipino coach Frank Muescan, the latter who lacks the appropriate license to coach a club in the continental tournament.

Honours

Manager
BEC Tero Sasana
Thailand Premier League: 2000
Kor Royal Cup: 2000

Home United
S.League runner-up: 2002

Indonesia
Pestabola Merdeka runner-up: 2006

Sukhothai
Thailand FA Cup: 2016

References

Living people
English footballers
English football managers
1971 births
Expatriate football managers in Thailand
Expatriate football managers in Singapore
West Bromwich Albion F.C. players
Stafford Rangers F.C. players
Stockport County F.C. players
Crewe Alexandra F.C. players
Burnley F.C. players
Telford United F.C. players
Kokkolan Palloveikot players
Veikkausliiga players
English expatriate footballers
Expatriate footballers in Finland
Leicester City F.C. non-playing staff
English football chairmen and investors
Jason Withe
Birmingham City F.C. non-playing staff
Home United FC head coaches
Jason Withe
Association football forwards